Targaremini is a tribe of dirt-colored seed bugs in the family Rhyparochromidae. There are more than 20 genera and 50 described species in Targaremini.

Genera
These 22 genera belong to the tribe Targaremini:

 Australotarma Woodward, 1978
 Baladeana Distant, 1914
 Calotargemus Scudder, 1978
 Forsterocoris Woodward, 1953
 Geratarma Malipatil, 1977
 Hebrolethaeus Scudder, 1962
 Lachnophoroides Distant, 1914
 Metagerra White, 1878
 Millerocoris Eyles, 1967
 Mirrhina Distant, 1920
 Paramirrhina Malipatil, 1983
 Paratruncala Malipatil, 1977
 Popondetta Woodward, 1978
 Regatarma Woodward, 1953
 Ruavatua Miller, 1956
 Sylvacligenes Scudder, 1962
 Targarema White, 1878
 Targarops Woodward, 1978
 Truncala Woodward, 1953
 Truncaloides Woodward, 1978
 Trypetocoris Woodward, 1953
 Woodwardiana Malipatil, 1977

References

Further reading

 

Rhyparochromidae
Insect tribes